The Loder Cup is a New Zealand conservation award. It was donated by Gerald Loder, 1st Baron Wakehurst in 1926 to "encourage and honour New Zealanders who work to investigate, promote, retain and cherish our indigenous flora". The Minister of Conservation awards the Loder Cup to a person or group of people who best represent the objectives of the Cup.

Recipients
The Loder Cup has been awarded to the following individuals and groups:
1929 – Duncan and Davies Ltd, New Plymouth
1930 – Henry Bennett and son
1931 – Henry Bennett and son
1933 – T. Waugh and son
1934 – Lord Bledisloe
1935 – Trustees of R. C. Bruce
1936 – John Scott Thomson & George Simpson
1937 – Auckland Institute & Museum and Lucy Cranwell
1938 – Elizabeth Knox Gilmer 
1939 – W. A. Thomson
1940 – P. H. Johnson
1941 – Edward Earle Vaile
1942 – A. W. Wastney
1943 – James Speden
1944 – Norman Potts
1945 – Walter Boa Brockie
1946 – Royal Forest & Bird Protection Society and Val Sanderson
1947 – N. R. W. Thomas
1948 – Andrew Davidson Beddie
1949 – Noeline Baker
1950 – Arthur Paul Harper
1951 – Lance McCaskill
1952 – Marguerite Crookes
1953 – Pérrine Moncrieff
1954 – Norman L. Elder
1955 – Michael Christian Gudex
1956 – Frank Singleton Holman
1957 – Frederick William Lokan
1958 – Ernest Corbett
1959 – Charles Cameron
1960 – William Marton
1961 – Charles Thomas Keeble
1962 – Bernard H. M. Teague
1963 – Nancy Adams
1964 – David Alfred Bathgate
1965 – Arthur Farnell
1966 – Oliver Hunter
1967 – John Salmon
1968 – Victor C. Davies
1969 – Patrick John Devlin
1970 – Muriel E. and William E. Fisher
1971 – Violet Ada Briffault
1972 – Arthur David Mead
1973 – Katie Reynolds
1974 – Alexander Walter Anderson
1975 – Alan Mark
1976 – Waipahihi Botanical Society, Taupo
1977 – Reginald Ivan Bell
1978 – Lawrence J. Metcalf
1979 – Roger & Christina Sutton
1980 – Whangarei Native Forest & Bird Protection Society (Inc.)
1981 – Raymond H. Mole
1982 – Arthur William Ericson
1983 – Roy J. Peacock
1984 – Eric Godley
1985 – Audrey Eagle
1986 – Roderick Syme
1987 – Hugh Wilson
1988 – Arthur Blair Cowan
1989 – no award
1990 – Brian Molloy
1991 – Reginald Janes
1992 – Gordon and Celia Stephenson
1993 – Michael Greenwood
1994 – Peter Johnson
1995 – David Given
1996 – Native Forests Restoration Trust
1997 – Isabel Morgan
1998 – Supporters of Tiritiri Matangi
1999 – Chris and Brian Rance
2000 – Jorge Santos
2001 – Colin Meurk
2002 – Marge Maddren
2003 – Gerry McSweeney
2004 – Colin Ogle
2005 – Ewen Cameron
2006 – Bruce Clarkson
2007 – Amanda Baird
2008 – Shannel Courtney
2009 – Philip Simpson
2010 – Colin Burrows
2011 – Mark Dean
2012 – Ralph Allen
2013 – Nick Head
2014 – Clive Paton
2015/16 – Barbara and Neill Simpson
2017 – Peter de Lange
2018 – Robert McGowan
2019 – Chris Horne
2020 – Graeme Atkins
2021 – Beverley Clarkson

Publications

See also
 Conservation in New Zealand
 List of environmental awards

References

Nature conservation in New Zealand
New Zealand awards
Environmental awards
1926 establishments in New Zealand